Sargus cuprarius, the clouded centurion, is a European species of soldier fly.

Description
Body length 6–12 mm.
Green eyes with a purple transverse line, upper edge dark or violet. Face and frons  with erect fine black hair; White 
spot at the base of each antenna. Proboscis yellowish brown. Black antennae. A shiny metallic green blue thorax, covered with fine yellow hair ( whitish in male). Wings with distinct darker spots below stigma. Black legs, yellow knees. Abdomen
copper, darker than the thorax with a purple or violet end (male);  violet with a copper base (female)

Biology
Found in open and wooded habitats and  humid places, from June. Larva in decomposing vegetable matter.

Distribution
Western Europe North and South European Russia, Caucasus; mountains of Central Asia, Mongolia, North America.

References

External links
Images representing Sargus cuprarius at Bold

Stratiomyidae
Diptera of Europe
Flies described in 1758
Taxa named by Carl Linnaeus